Saighir (Seir Kieran; also named Seirkieran, in Irish Saighir Chiaráin), is a monastic site in Clareen, County Offaly, founded by Ciarán of Saigir.

History
According to his hagiographers, Ciarán was born in pagan Ireland and left for Rome to receive Christian baptism and study the Bible.  In Rome for twenty or thirty years, he was ordained a bishop and returned to Ireland.  On the way, he is said to have met Saint Patrick in Italy and from him received a clapperless bell; whence Patrick told Ciarán to found a church when the bell should miraculously sound, and nearby would be a cold spring. Upon returning to Ireland, he evangelized his paternal kinsmen, the Osraige, and passed through their territory and over the Slieve Bloom Mountains when he heard the tongueless bell sound, and nearby was a spring of cold water.

The church grew in importance and as one of Ireland's oldest Christian sites. As the main monastery in Osraige it was the burial ground for the Kings of Osraige of the Dál Birn. Several times it was sacked by the Vikings, and later it diminished in importance and was superseded by Aghaboe Abbey c.1052. It was refounded as a priory of the Augustinian Canons c.1170, and dissolved in 1568.

Not much survives of Saighir today.  The remaining ruins include the base of a round tower, the base of a 9th-century high cross, some foundations of the priory, remainings of fortifications, a motte of the Anglo-Norman lords, and a small 19th-century church which was erected close to the site of the former church of the priory. Attached to the site are a holy whitethorn bush on which clothes are hung on 5 March in honor of St. Ciarán, and a holy well.

Saighir in the Annals

695 St Killen MacLubnen was abbot of Saighir
744 Laidhgnen Abbot of Saighir was slain
771 Tnuthghal the Abbot died
783 (recte 788) Maccog the Abbot died 
788 (recte 793) Cucathrach of Saighir died 
807 (recte 812) Cobhthach the Abbot died 
809 (recte 814) Fearadhach the Abbot died 
810 (recte 815) Conchobar the Abbot died 
826 Connmhach Ua Loichene the Abbot died 
832 Irghalach the Abbot died 
842 Plundering of Birr and Saighir by the Gentiles
846 Anluan the Abbot died
867 Cormac son of Eladhach Abbot of Saighir bishop and scribe died 
870 Geran son of Dicosc the Abbot died 
885 Sloghadhach Ua Raithnen the Abbot died 
912 Cormac Bishop of Saighir died
919 Fearghal son of Maelmordha the Abbot died 
920 Aedh Ua Raithnen old sage of Ireland and wise man of Saighir died
937 Ceallach son of Caellaighe Prior of Saighir died 
941 Fogartach the Abbot died 
941-4 At this time Sadhbh Queen of Ireland wife of the Ard Righ Donn chadh son of Flann Sionna and daughter of Donnchadh King of Ossory grieved that Saighir the burial place of her ancestors lay open and defenceless while so many other famous churches in Ireland were encircled by walls induced her royal husband to send a number of masons to erect a suitable wall of stone around the cemetery
951 Ceannfaeladh son of Suibhne Abbot of Saighir died 
952 Saighir Chiarain was plundered by the men of Munster 
961 Fearghal son of Ceallach died at Saighir after penance 
974 or 975 Donnchadh King of Ossory father of Queen Sadhbh or Sabia above died at an advanced age and was buried with his forefathers at Saighir 
984 Flaithlemh airchinneach of Saighir died 
1004 Foghartach Abbot of Leithghlinn and Saighir died 
1012 The Prior of Saighir was killed 
1048 Dunchadh Ua Ceileachair successor of Ciarán of Saighir died
1079 Ceallach Reamhar the Fat successor of Brenainn of Birr and of Ciarán of Saighir died
1118 The See of Ossory was changed from Seir Kieran to Aghaboe (most probably by the Synod of Rathbreasail held in this year)
1200 About this date the old Irish order of monks at Saighir having become extinct or been superseded the monastery church and parish were handed over to the Canons Regular of the Order of St Augustine who established a community here and continued in possession down to the Reformation
1284 The Lord Bishop of Ossory Geoffry St Leger acquired (recte recovered) the manor of Serrkeran by duel according to Clynn and others

Keating's story about Saighir's wall

Geoffrey Keating related a story of the building of a wall around the royal graveyard of Saighir in his work Foras Feasa ar Éirinn:

"Donnchadh, son of Flann Sionna, son of Maoilseachlainn, son of Maolruanuidh, son of Donnchadh, son of Domhnall, son of Murchadh, son of Diarmaid, son of Airmeadhach Caoch, son of Conall Guithbhinn, son of Suibhne Meann of the race of Eireamhon, held the sovereignty of Ireland twenty years. Gormfhlaith, daughter of Flann, son of Conaing, was the mother of this Donnchadh, and his wife was Sadhbh, daughter of Donnchadh, son of Ceallach, king of Osruighe. And according to the book of Ard Macha this Donnchadh, son of Flann, king of Ireland, went with a large party to build a wall or fence round Saighir Chiarain by the direction of his wife, namely, Sadhbh, daughter of Donnchadh, son of Ceallach; for she felt envious at there being a wall or fence round every principal church in Ireland, while her own church, that is Saighir, was without a wall; for the burying place of the kings of Osruighe was at Saighir Chiarain at that time. Accordingly, the men of Meath came to Donnchadh's mound beside Saighir to the west, and they set themselves to build the fence round the church day by day; and at this time the body of Donnchadh, son of Ceallach, king of Osruighe, was brought to Saighir to be buried; and after it was buried, when the darkness of night had set in, nine hairy jet-black crosans came upon the grave and set to choir-chanting as crosans are wont to do ever since, and their eyes and their teeth were whiter than snow, and all their other limbs blacker than blacksmith's coal.

They had come, it seems, bringing with them a lay for the king of Osruighe. And all who saw them grew sick a day and a night at the sight. Here is the lay:

The people of Donnchadha Mor son of Ceallach, 
A proud quarterage, 
Melodious bands who are calling out 
Are we when on a hosting:
Hosts hunting, full plains, 
Houses for drinking, 
Fair young women, hospitable princes, 
Great nobles;
The shout of his companies and his troops, 
The quarterage of a good host; 
Ranks of skirmishers in the summer sun, 
Drinking cups, feast-shouts;
Harps and pipes in harmony. 
Filés of Faibhle 
With a fair new poem they used to come 
To the gracious king of Raighne;
Dod dor dod dan, O son of the king of Raighne, 
With prosperity, 
Where are the goblets where the friendship 
That thy father had?
May a pang seized us for the man 
Whom all amused, 
Excellent the course on which he was 
In the fair world;
Baptais baptain on his soul 
Since it is heard, 
Great his reward after going to the other world, 
We are his people.

Now this band used to keep chanting this lay from nightfall till morning every night over the grave of Donnchadh, so that a doubt arose in the minds of clergy and laity, for they were surprised that demons should be openly attending the body of that most virtuous king. Indeed, among the pious practices of the king were frequent confession and the receiving of the Body of Christ and fervent prayers; and among his exercises of holy zeal was to send food and provisions to be given to God's poor in each principal church in Osruighe on each of the apostles' feasts. Moreover, he used to place an orphan or a poor man to be maintained for God's sake in every
household throughout Osruighe, and had besides three purses or three leather bags, to wit, a bag in which each person of the household put a tithe of the food he ate, and a bag in which each put his Michael's portion, and a third bag in which a portion of beeswax was put, which was at the disposal of the housewife to dispense to the poor who had got no share of the tithes or of the Michael's portion.
As to the clerics, they fasted and prayed for three days that it might be made known to them why the demons attended the king's body; and an angel of God appeared in a vision to a servant of God of the race of Fiachaidh son of Niall, who was in that assembly. ‘Ye have done well in keeping that fast,’ said the angel, ‘now these are nine of the company of Ui Coingheoidh, and this is the third time they have come to Ireland from hell; and since they could not find an occasion against this king during his life, they are causing a disturbance over his body after his death; and do ye have Mass said and water blessed to-morrow,’ continued the angel, ‘and let it be sprinkled on the grave and throughout all the churchyard, and all the demons will go away.’

This was done and the company of Ui Coingheoidh appeared in the air above, in the form of jet black birds, and they did not venture to light on the churchyard ground because of its having been blessed; and they said that the fasting and the bleesing of the grave by the clergy were necessary, ‘for we would be after his body on earth since we have not power over his soul in heaven’. And thereupon they went out of sight of all and they did not see them ever since. It was about this time that the crosan Fionn O Cionga and Mac Rionntach O Connorain lived, and it was they who learned by rote the above-mentioned lay from the company of Ui Coinghaoidh while they were chanting it above the grave of Donnchadh, son of Ceallach, king of Osruighe, and the two referred to practised crosantacht as an art until death."

See also
Carthage the Elder
Seir Kieran GAA

References

External links
 Seir Kieran Parish website
National Monuments Service
National Monuments Service Map
Bishops of Ossory
Seir Kieran
Monastic Ireland - Seirkieran Priory
Offaly History
The Standing Stone, Seir Kieran

Christian monasticism
Medieval Ireland
FitzPatrick dynasty
National Monuments in County Offaly